U.S. Army General Hospital No. 1, also known as Columbia War Hospital, was a World War I era field hospital built by Columbia University on the Columbia Oval property in Norwood, The Bronx. The hospital was used as a medical training facility, a model for military field hospitals, and for long-term treatment of patients.

Columbia Oval 
The property that the hospital was built on was an athletic field owned by Columbia University called "Columbia Oval". The hospital property was in what was then considered part of the Williamsbridge neighborhood. The location is now part of the Norwood neighborhood. Columbia Oval was the finish line of the first marathon within the United States, in 1896. The marathon was won by John McDermott, a year before he won the first Boston Marathon in 1897.

Columbia War Hospital 
The Columbia War Hospital was conceived by the head of Columbia's Department of Urology, J. Bentley Squier in March, 1917 Construction began the following month, and the hospital was ready to admit patients by May 30, 1917.

General Hospital No. 1 
The hospital was renamed by the army to "United States Army General Hospital No. 1" in August, 1917.
The hospital was transferred over to Colonel E. R. Schreiner of the United States Army on October 3, 1917, in a ceremony conducted by Columbia university's president Nicholas Murray Butler.

Additional facilities 
The hospital had additional facilities in: 
 The Montefiore Home, (Norwood, Bronx), located across the street from the hospital, provided accommodations for military officers at a newly created facility called "Van Cortlandt Private Hospital".
 The Messiah Home for Children, 1771 Andrews Avenue University Heights, Bronx, and the adjacent Camp Estate, both provided by the Catholic War Council with a nominal rent of $1 per month.
 Bloomingdale Hospital (in White Plains, New York)

Later history 
The hospital was closed on October 15, 1919. After the end of the Great War, the 54 buildings that made up the Columbia Oval site were razed. Former patients who required long-term care after the closing of the hospital were transferred to the care of Montefiore Medical Center. In October 1922 the 19 acre site was auctioned by the university for a total of $351,950 as 225 separate lots.
($5,445,127.39 in 2020 US dollars per www.usinflationcalculator.com.) 
One of the streets created on the former field is named "Kings College Place", after Columbia University's original name.

Gallary

See also 
 John McDermott (runner)
 Montefiore Medical Center
 National Catholic Welfare Council
 Pelham Bay Naval Training Station
 Rockefeller War Demonstration Hospital
 Woodlawn Cemetery (Bronx)

References

External links 
 
 Columbia Oval at the WikiCU wiki
 Columbia University Library
 Columbia's war work (pages 16-19)

1910s in the Bronx
1917 establishments in New York City
Defunct hospitals in the Bronx
Demolished buildings and structures in the Bronx
Closed medical facilities of the United States Army
History of Columbia University
Hospitals established in 1917
Hospitals disestablished in 1919
Hospitals of the United States Army
Installations of the United States Army in New York (state)
Military facilities in the Bronx
Military history of New York City
Norwood, Bronx
World War I sites in the United States